A pentachloride is a compound or ion that contains five chlorine atoms or ions. Some examples include:

Antimony pentachloride, SbCl5
Arsenic pentachloride, AsCl5
Phosphorus pentachloride, PCl5
Protactinium(V) chloride, PaCl5
Rhenium pentachloride, Re2Cl10,